Harold John Timperley (1898–1954) was an Australian journalist, known for his reporting in China in the 1930s and for authoring the book What War Means (1938) based on it.  Historian Hora Tomio described What War Means as "a book which shocked awake Western intellectuals".

Life
He started his newspaperman career in China in 1921 and reported for the Manchester Guardian from 1928, based in Peiping (1921–1936), Shanghai (1936 – Apr? 1937, Sep 1937 – Apr 1938) and Nanjing (May? – Sep 1937). He became an advisory editor of ASIA magazine in 1934 (see ASIA of November, 1938). He married Elizabeth Chambers in Nanjing in August 1937.

After the Japanese invasion, his accounts for the Guardian were some of the firsthand information most easily available in the West. His cables from Shanghai, although at times censored, formed the basis for some early writing on the Nanjing massacre from 1937 to 1938.

Timperley left Shanghai for London early April 1938. There, he published the book What War Means, edited by him, which contains direct testimony as well as official documents. It received great attention, being published in the US under the title The Japanese Terror in China. Its content has been contested by Japanese historians, including Minoru Kitamura. Minoru Kitamura proposed a view that Timperley did not appear as a witness in Nanjing War Crimes Tribunal and International Military Tribunal for the Far East because he might have been a spin doctor.

Timperley became involved in an attempt to stir the United Kingdom to act on behalf of China. He was close to the Nationalists and Chiang Kai-shek; it is a matter of some dispute to what extent he was supported by them, or was engaged in propaganda work on their behalf. It is not contested that he took a strongly anti-war line, and on a personal level was friendly with Japanese including the Shanghai Domei News Agency chief Matsumoto Shigeharu. Some of the statistics Timperley used have been mis-employed by subsequent writers taking What War Means as a source.

In 1939, he gave up journalism and served for the Chinese Ministry of Information, as an advisor.
He continued to write on topics connected with Japan, including the nationalist thinker Yoshida Shoin, until the end of the Pacific War. From 1943, he worked for the Information Office of United Nations (Allied Powers).

From 1946, he worked for UNRRA at its Shanghai office. 
In 1947, the United Nations Security Council established the Good Offices Committee for Indonesia to sponsor negotiations between the country and the Netherlands, and Timperley was assigned as Deputy Principal Secretary (later to an Acting Principal Secretary) of the committee (from May 1948?) until 20 October 1948. 
Afterward, he worked for UNESCO in Paris.

Leaving UNESCO in 1950, Timperley went to Indonesia as a technical advisor to the Indonesian Ministry of Foreign Affairs. However a tropical disease forced him to leave Jakarta for London in 1951.

Not long after his arrival in London, he came in touch with the Religious Society of Friends and was admitted to the membership in 1952. From January 1954, he threw himself into supporting the War on Want campaign and acted as full-time voluntary office worker. He organized the first War on Want Conference in May 1954.

On 25 November 1954, he was found unconscious in bed and taken to a Cuckfield hospital, but died the following day (26 November 1954).

Relation with publicity department of Chinese Nationalist Party 
In "An Overview of Propaganda Operations of the International Information Division of the Central Propaganda Bureau of the Nationalist Party from 1938 to April 1941" held in the Guomindang Historical Documents Archive in Taipei, it is clearly mentioned that "What War Means" was a propaganda book written to fight against the enemy, edited and printed by this organization. From this fact, Shudo Higashinakano agrees with the view of Minoru Kitamura and Akira Suzuki, that Timperley's book was a propaganda of Chinese Nationalist Party. On the other hand, Hisashi Watanabe claims that Timperley had yet no connection with Chinese Nationalist Party at the time, criticizing Minoru Kitamura. On 16 April 2015, Sankei Shimbun reported the discovery of documents detailing Timperley's activities as the head of the UK Branch of the International Information Division (London), which strongly supports his involvement in the propaganda operation.

Works 

 What War Means: The Japanese Terror in China, London, Victor Gollancz Ltd,1938. (There are two editions, Left Book Club and non LBC editions.)
 The Japanese Terror in China, New York, Modern Age Books, 1938.
Japan: A World Problem, New York, The John Day Company, 1942.
Australia and the Australians, New York, Oxford University Press, 1942.
Some Contrast Between China and Japan in The Light of History /10-page leaflet, London, The China Society, publication date unknown.
The War on Want /5-page leaflet, London, Gledhill & Ballinger Ltd., 1953.

References

External links 
Guardian story from 2002
Country Studies: Indonesia: The National Revolution, 1945–50

1898 births
1954 deaths
20th-century Australian journalists
The Guardian journalists
People from Western Australia
UNESCO officials
Australian expatriates in the United Kingdom
Australian expatriates in China